The Nemei River is a tributary of the Churchill River. It rises in Nemei Lake and flows northward to join Churchill River near Sandy Bay. It runs through low relief terrain of the Canadian Shield. The climate is sub-arctic.

Location

The Nemei river flows into the Churchill river below Reindeer River.
The indigenous name means "sturgeon".
The Nemei joins the Churchill downstream from the Island Falls power dam, built in 1929.
Phelan Lake drains northwest into Nemei Lake and then via the Nemei River to the Churchill River.
Phelan Lake is accessible from the south via the Wildnest-Kakinagimak-Nemei Lakes water route.
Robbestad Lake, McArthur Lake and the northern part of Kakinagimak Lake also drain northward via the Nemei River.

Environment
The Nemei River is in the subarctic climate zone.
The region has low relief topography typical of most of the Canadian Shield.
The land around the river is mainly forested.

Saskatchewan Highway 135 crosses the river on a berm, with the river directed through the berm along tubular culverts.
These were initially installed too high, emptying above the downstream river level and thus blocking fish passage.
New  tubular culverts were later installed at river level so the fish could swim upstream.

See also
List of rivers of Saskatchewan
Hudson Bay drainage basin

Notes

Citations

Sources

Rivers of Saskatchewan
Tributaries of Hudson Bay